The 2019 Nigerian House of Representatives elections in Niger State was held on February 23, 2019, to elect members of the House of Representatives to represent Niger State, Nigeria.

Overview

Summary

Results

Shiroro/Rafi/Munya 
A total of 7 candidates registered with the Independent National Electoral Commission to contest in the election. APC candidate Umar Saidu Doka won the election, defeating PDP Abdullahi Ricco Mohammed and 5 other party candidates. Doka received 67.74% of the votes, while Mohammed received 29.63%.

Magama/Rijau 
A total of 11 candidates registered with the Independent National Electoral Commission to contest in the election. APC candidate Shehu Saleh won the election, defeating PDP Garba Mohammed Dukku and 9 other party candidates. Saleh received 62.18% of the votes, while Dukku received 37.02%.

Lavun/Mokwa/Edati 
A total of 11 candidates registered with the Independent National Electoral Commission to contest in the election. APC candidate Usman Abdullahi won the election, defeating PDP Abubakar Sulaiman and 9 other party candidates. Abdullahi received 54.45% of the votes, while Sulaiman received 37.82%.

Kontagora/Wushishi/Mariga/Mashegu 
A total of 12 candidates registered with the Independent National Electoral Commission to contest in the election. APC candidate Abdullahi Idris Garba won the election, defeating PDP Sa'adatu Kolo Mohammed and 10 other party candidates. Garba received 75.72% of the votes, while Mohammed received 19.98%.

Gurara/Suleja/Tapa 
A total of 14 candidates registered with the Independent National Electoral Commission to contest in the election. APC candidate Abdullahi Abubakar Lado won the election, defeating PDP Danladi Tekpezhi Iyah and 12 other party candidates. Lado received 52.39% of the votes, while Iyah received 37.42%.

Chanchaga 
A total of 18 candidates registered with the Independent National Electoral Commission to contest in the election. APC candidate Mohammed Umar Bago won the election, defeating PDP Abubakar Abdul Buba and 16 other party candidates. Bago received 61.94% of the votes, while Buba received 28.09%.

Bosso/Paikoro 
A total of 3 candidates registered with the Independent National Electoral Commission to contest in the election. APC candidate Shehu Barwa Beji won the election, defeating PDP Mohammed Dada Abdullahi and 1 other party candidate. Beji received 59.90% of the votes, while Abdullahi received 27.79%.

Bida/Gbako/Katcha 
A total of 14 candidates registered with the Independent National Electoral Commission to contest in the election. APC candidate Saidu Musa Abdul won the election, defeating PDP Sharu Mohammed Baba and 12 other party candidates. Abdul received 58.43% of the votes, while Baba received 38.44%.

Agwara/Borgu 
A total of 9 candidates registered with the Independent National Electoral Commission to contest in the election. APC candidate Mohammed Jafaru won the election, defeating PDP Abdulrahman Bala Gambo and 7 other party candidates. Jafaru received 60.41% of the votes, while Gambo received 37.45%.

Agaie/Lapai 
A total of 12 candidates registered with the Independent National Electoral Commission to contest in the election. APC candidate Mamudu Abdullahi won the election, defeating PDP Isah Saidu and 10 other party candidates. Abdullahi received 54.66% of the votes, while Saidu received 39.76%.

References 

Niger State House of Representatives elections
House of Representatives
Niger